Antigonish County is a historical county and census division of Nova Scotia, Canada. Local government is provided by the Municipality of the County of Antigonish, the Town of Antigonish, and by two reserves: Pomquet and Afton 23, and Summerside 38.

History
The County of Sydney was created in 1784.

When St. Mary's Township was established in 1818 it was partly in Sydney County and partly in Halifax County. In 1822 that part of St. Mary's Township which had been in Halifax County was annexed to the County of Sydney.

In 1836 Sydney County was diminished in size when Guysborough County was established out of what had been part of it. In 1863 the name of the County of Sydney was changed to Antigonish County. The word Antigonish is of Mi'kmaq origin, possibly derived from Nalegitkoonecht meaning "where branches are torn off". It is said that there were bears in the area that broke down branches to get beech nuts.

In 1879, the province officially incorporated the County of Antigonish as a municipality.

In 2001, the Town of Antigonish applied to annex 1,600 hectares from the surrounding county so it could expand. The Municipality responded that the annexation would hurt its tax base so it instead applied for a total merger, or amalgamation. The issue was sent to the Nova Scotia Utility and Review Board, and in 2005 it was decided that amalgamation of the Town and Municipality would better serve both parties. The board also ordered a plebiscite, promising to consider the results when making a final decision. The results were mixed, with 84% of Municipality residents voting yes to amalgamation and 74% of Town residents voting no. Voter turn-out was 45%. The board ultimately rejected the proposal for amalgamation, citing lack of public support.

Demographics

Population trend

Mother tongue language (2011)

Ethnic Groups (2006)

Census subdivisions
Antigonish Subdivision A
Antigonish Subdivision B

Major highways
Highways and numbered routes that run through the county, including external routes that start or finish at the county limits:

Highways

Trunk Routes

Collector Routes:

External Routes:
None

Protected areas

Arisaig Provincial Park
Antigonish Landing
Bayfield Provincial Park
Beaver Mountain Provincial Park
Eigg Mountain-James River Wilderness Area
Pomquet Beach Provincial Park

Allan Hugh MacDonald, theoretical physicist

Notable residents
Donald Chisholm, stockcar driver
Mary-Colin Chisholm, stage, film and TV actor
Moses Coady, Roman Catholic priest, adult educator, and leader of the Antigonish Movement
Eric Gillis, 2008, 2012 Olympian (athletics-10,000m, marathon)
Max Haines, crime writer, columnist for the Toronto Sun
Allan The Ridge MacDonald (1794-1868), local pioneer, and poet in Canadian Gaelic.
Craig MacDonald, former professional hockey player
Garfield MacDonald, Olympic Athlete
John MacLean (d.1848), local pioneer, poet and Seanchaidh. A highly important figure in both Scottish Gaelic literature and in that of Canadian Gaelic. 
Shauna MacDonald, actress, also known as "Promo Girl" on CBC Radio One
Ryan MacGrath, musician and painter
Al MacIsaac, Vice President Chicago Blackhawks
Paul MacLean, assistant coach of the Toronto Maple Leafs
Carole MacNeil, television journalist, former co-host of CBC News: Sunday and CBC News: Sunday Night
Stephen McHattie, stage, film and TV actor
Robyn Meagher, Olympic runner
Carroll Morgan, Olympic heavyweight boxer
Archbishop James Morrison, Catholic Bishop 1912
Anne Simpson, poet
 Lewis John Stringer, Cross of Valour (Canada) Recipient, Wall of Valour
The Trews, a rock band

See also
 List of communities in Nova Scotia
 List of municipalities in Nova Scotia

References

External links
 Antigonish County

Antigonish County, Nova Scotia
1785 establishments in Nova Scotia